Linda Pastan (May 27, 1932 – January 30, 2023) was an American poet of Jewish background. From 1991 to 1995 she was Poet Laureate of Maryland. She was known for writing short poems that address topics like family life, domesticity, motherhood, the female experience, aging, death, loss and the fear of loss, as well as the fragility of life and relationships. Her most recent collections of poetry include Insomnia, Traveling Light, and A Dog Runs Through It.

Career in writing
Pastan published 15 books of poetry and a number of essays. Her awards include the Dylan Thomas Award, a Pushcart Prize, the Alice Fay di Castagnola Award (Poetry Society of America), the Bess Hokin Prize (Poetry Magazine), the 1986 Maurice English Poetry Award (for A Fraction of Darkness), the Charity Randall Citation of the International Poetry Forum, and the 2003 Ruth Lilly Poetry Prize. She also received the Radcliffe College Distinguished Alumnae Award.

Two of her collections of poems were nominated for the National Book Award and one for the Los Angeles Times Book Prize.

Personal life and death
As of 2018, Pastan  lived in Chevy Chase, Maryland, with her husband Ira Pastan, a physician and researcher.

Pastan died at her home in Chevy Chase on January 30, 2023, at the age of 90.

Bibliography

Poetry 
Collections
 
 Aspects of Eve. New York: Liveright. 1975, 
 On the way to the zoo: poems, Illustrated by Raya Bodnarchuk, Dryad Press, 1975
 Marks. 1978
 The Five Stages of Grief. New York: W. W. Norton & Co., 1978
 Setting the Table Dryad Press. 1980
 Waiting For My Life. New York: W. W. Norton & Co. 1981, 
 PM / AM. New York: W. W. Norton & Co. 1982, 
 A Fraction of Darkness. New York: Norton, 1985 
 The Imperfect Paradise. New York: W.W. Norton & Company, 1988, 
 Heroes in Disguise. New York: W. W. Norton & Co. 1991, 
 An Early Afterlife. New York: W. W. Norton & Co. 1995, 
 Carnival Evening. New and Selected Poems: 1968 – 1998. New York: W. W.  Norton & Co. 1998, 
 The Last Uncle. New York: W. W. Norton & Co. 2001, 
 Queen of a Rainy Country: Poems. W. W. Norton & Co. 2006, 
 
 Insomnia: Poems. New York: W. W. Norton & Co. 2015. 
 A Dog Runs Through It. New York: W. W. Norton & Co. 2018. 
 Almost an Elegy: New and Later Selected Poems. New York: W. W. Norton & Co. 2022. 

List of poems

Critical studies and reviews of Pastan's work
 Franklin, Benjamin. 1981. "Theme and Structure in Linda Pastan's Poetry". In: Poet Lore. 75 (4). 234 – 241.
 Mishkin, Tracy. 2004 "Aspects of Eve: The Garden of Eden in the Poetry of Linda Pastan". In: Behlau, Ulrike (ed.), Reitz, Bernhard (ed.). Jewish Women's Writing of the 1990s and Beyond. Trier: Wissenschaftlicher Verlag. 95 – 103.
 "Whatever is at Hand. A Conversation with Linda Pastan". 1989. In: Ingersoll, Earl (ed.), Kitchen, Judith (ed.), Rubin, Stan (ed.). The Post-Confessionals: Conversations with American Poets of the Eighties. New York: Associated University Press. 135 – 149.

References

External links

 Linda Pastan on Norton Poets Online
 A Selection of Poems by Linda Pastan
 Linda Pastan:  Online Poems at alittlepoetry.com
 
 Linda Pastan papers at University of Maryland Libraries

1932 births
2023 deaths
21st-century American women
American women poets
Jewish poets
The New Yorker people
Poets Laureate of Maryland
Poets from New York (state)
Radcliffe College alumni
Harvard University alumni
21st-century American Jews